The women's tournament of the 2019 New Holland Canadian Junior Curling Championships was held from January 19 to 27 at the Art Hauser Centre and the Prince Albert Golf & Curling Club.

Teams
The teams are listed as follows:

Round-robin standings

Round-robin results
All draw times are listed in Eastern Standard Time (UTC−5:00).

Pool A

Draw 2
Saturday, January 19, 15:00

Draw 3
Saturday, January 19, 20:30

Draw 4
Sunday, January 20, 10:00

Draw 5
Sunday, January 20, 15:00

Draw 6
Sunday, January 20, 20:00

Draw 7
Monday, January 21, 10:00

Draw 8
Monday, January 21, 15:00

Draw 9
Monday, January 21, 20:00

Draw 10
Tuesday, January 22, 10:00

Draw 11
Tuesday, January 22, 15:00

Draw 12
Tuesday, January 22, 20:00

Pool B

Draw 1
Saturday, January 19, 10:00

Draw 2
Saturday, January 19, 15:00

Draw 3
Saturday, January 19, 20:30

Draw 5
Sunday, January 20, 15:00

Draw 6
Sunday, January 20, 20:00

Draw 8
Monday, January 21, 15:00

Draw 9
Monday, January 21, 20:00

Draw 10
Tuesday, January 22, 10:00

Draw 11
Tuesday, January 22, 15:00

Draw 12
Tuesday, January 22, 20:00

Placement round

Seeding pool

Standings

Draw 14
Wednesday, January 23, 14:00

Draw 15
Wednesday, January 23, 19:00

Draw 16
Thursday, January 24, 09:00

Draw 17
Thursday, January 24, 14:00

Draw 18
Thursday, January 24, 19:00

Championship pool

Championship pool standings

Draw 14
Wednesday, January 23, 14:00

Draw 15
Wednesday, January 23, 19:00

Draw 16
Thursday, January 24, 09:00

Draw 17
Thursday, January 24, 14:00

Draw 18
Thursday, January 24, 19:00

Draw 19
Friday, January 25, 09:00

Tiebreaker
Friday, January 25, 14:00

Playoffs

Semifinal
Saturday, January 26, 13:00

Final
Sunday, January 27, 10:00

References

External links

Junior Championships
Canadian Junior Curling Championships, 2019
Canadian Junior Curling Championships
Canadian Junior Curling
2019 in women's curling